Jamie Stevenson (born 15 April 1966) is a former Australian rules footballer who played with North Melbourne in the Victorian Football League (VFL).

Stevenson, a Yarrawonga recruit, first broke into the North Melbourne side late in the 1985 season. He didn't play a senior game in 1986, then appeared in seven of the opening eight rounds in 1987, but missed the rest of the season when he broke his collarbone against Carlton. After playing only six more league games, Stevenson moved to Sturt, where he played from 1991 to 1993. He went to Albury in 1994 and during that season had a 13-goal haul in a game.

References

1966 births
Australian rules footballers from Victoria (Australia)
North Melbourne Football Club players
Sturt Football Club players
Yarrawonga Football Club players
Albury Football Club players
Living people